Ramón Alberto González Adams (December 22, 1985 – May 10, 2014), better known by his stage name Jadiel, was a Puerto Rican reggaeton singer. In May 2014, he was killed in a motorcycle accident in Rochester, New York.

Early life 
Ramón Alberto González Adams was born in Ponce, Puerto Rico on December 22, 1985.  At an early age, he began to show an interest to music and began to compose his songs at age of 8. As he grew up, he began to get better at creating his songs and at the age of 18 he started his reggaeton career. He always liked to experiment with the different types of melodies and tried to make all his songs special and unique.

Musical career 
He started his musical career with the music company Denbow Music Inc. Throughout his career he has worked with several notable reggaeton artist including, Arcángel, Farruko, Tito "El Bambino", Franco "El Gorilla", and many more.

On September 2, 2008, Jadiel's first studio album, Lo Mejor De Mi, was released. It includes his hit songs including, "Pretty Girl", "Para Que Volver (feat. Arcángel)", "Alárgame La Vida" and many more.

In 2009, he was featured in the popular song "La Nena Del Caserio" which included, Wibal & Alex, Kendo Kaponi, Ñengo Flow, Farruko, Chyno Nyno, Joan & O'Neill, J Alvarez, and Jory Boy.

Throughout 2011 to 2014, he started gaining more success when he released several songs and collaborating with multiple artists. During that period he released the songs "La Cucaracha", "Amor Para Ti", "La Vas a Pagar Caro", and "El Hombre de tu vida".

Some of his last work was with Los De La Nazza, a popular Puerto Rican production duo. He released "Tristeza Interna" and "Me Descontrolo" with them.

Death 
On May 10, 2014, Jadiel was riding on his new motorcycle that his brother bought for him, with his brother, on another motorcycle traveling alongside him. They were traveling east on Route 104 across from Maplewood Park when Jadiel lost control of his motorcycle and accidentally crossed the median that separated both sides of the freeway. He was pronounced dead in Strong Memorial Hospital at around 5:00p.m.

Legacy 
His death was mourned by the reggaeton community in Puerto Rico. Several reggaeton artists came together and made a 22-minute song in his honor called "Jadiel Forever". The song features several known artists including Nicky Jam, Zion & Lennox, and Farruko. His first posthumous album Tsunami Is Back was released on February 14, 2017, three years after his death. It includes several unreleased songs.

Discography

Studio albums

2008: Lo Mejor De Mi

Mixtapes 

 2017: Tsunami Is Back

References

1985 births
2014 deaths
Puerto Rican reggaeton musicians
21st-century Puerto Rican male singers
Road incident deaths in New York (state)
Motorcycle road incident deaths
Singers from Ponce